Denny Cardin (born 3 August 1988) is an Italian footballer who plays for ACD Portomansuè.

Biography
Since 2007–08 season, Cardin was co-owned by Portogruaro and Atalanta. The club purchased Cardin and Matteo Scozzarella for €7,500 each. He followed the team promoted to Lega Pro Prima Divisione in 2008 as playoff winner. In 2010 the team promoted to Serie B. However the team relegated in 2011. Atalanta gave up the remain 50% registration rights in June 2011 for free.

In July 2011 he left for Foggia. On 8 February 2013 he was signed by Carpi. On 5 July 2013 he was signed by Mantova F.C.

Representative teams
He played for Italy under-20 Lega Pro representative team in 2008–09 Mirop Cup. He also finished as the runner-up in 2008 Trofeo Dossena with the representative team, but not played in the final against Grêmio youth team.

Honours
Lega Pro Prima Divisione: 2010

Footnotes

References

External links
 Football.it Profile 

Italian footballers
Atalanta B.C. players
A.S.D. Portogruaro players
Calcio Foggia 1920 players
A.C. Carpi players
Mantova 1911 players
Serie B players
Serie C players
Association football defenders
Sportspeople from the Province of Treviso
1988 births
Living people
Footballers from Veneto